Tata Tinplate, listed as The Tinplate Company of India Limited (TCIL), is a subsidiary of Tata Steel. Founded in 1920, TCIL is India's oldest and current largest tinplate manufacturer. TCIL has a 70% market share in India and exports a fourth of its products outside India.

History 
On January 20, 1920, the Burmah Oil and The Tata Iron & Steel Company (TISCO) jointly incorporated The Tinplate Company of India Limited (TCIL) to cater the demand that arose during World War 1.

By November 1921, structural steel for the plant and machinery were imported from USA and UK and, the plant was set up at Golmuri, near the Tata Steel works, Jamshedpur. By December 18, 1922, first Hot Dip Plant started rolling out finished tinplate. In April 1928, the Victoria brand kerosene oil of the Burmah Oil, was packed in cans made from the tin sheets produced at TCIL.

With the outbreak of World War 2, TCIL diversified into the manufacturing of un-tinned black plates used in Jettison tanks for the Royal Air Force. Also TCIL took over processing of steel from sheet mills of Tata Steel to augment production.

Expansion 
TCIL entered into an agreement with Wean United Canada, for switching to Electrolytic Tinning Process. In 1973, ETL-1 was commissioned with a capacity of 90,000 tons per annum, capable of producing tinplate and tin free steel. In 1996, TCIL setup its first Cold Rolling Mill Complex (CRM-1) with a capacity of 110,000 tons per annum, as part of backward integration to produce TMBP coils as raw material for the tinning line there by removing the dependence on imports. In 2005, TCIL commissioned a printing and lacquering line, as a part of forward integration, thereby reducing supply chain inefficiencies.

In 2007, TCIL  doubled the capacity by commissioning of the second Tinning Line (ETL-2), enhancing the mill capacity from 179,000 MT to 379,000 MT. In 2008, TCIL set up its second Cold Rolling Mill (CRM-2) facility to meet the requirements of TMBP coils to feed the second tinning line ETL-2. Addition of new assets increased the company's turnover by lifting the production and sales to 360,000 tons in 2018–19.

In 2012, Tata Steel increased its shareholding in TCIL to 73.44% which currently stands at 74.96%

Through volumes, TCIL holds 70% market share in India and exports 25% of the production to South-East Asia, Europe, and the Middle East.

In August 2021, announced its expansion plans, an additional capacity of 3,00,000 tons per annum.

Products 
TCIL manufactures Tinplate as cut sheets & coils, Electrolytic Tinplate, Tin Free Steel (TFS)/Electrolytic Chromium Coated Steel (ECCS) and other value-added/downstream products. TCIL caters diverse segments, including but not restricted to Edible Oils, Paints & Pesticides, Processed Foods, Battery & Aerosols, and manufacturers of bottle crowns. In 2018, TCIL introduced 'PAXEL', India's first branded tin can for edible oil packaging.

References 

Steel companies of India
Companies based in Kolkata
Manufacturing companies established in 1982
Companies listed on the National Stock Exchange of India
Companies listed on the Bombay Stock Exchange